The 2020 UEFA European Under-17 Championship (also known as UEFA Under-17 Euro 2020) was originally to be held as the 19th UEFA European Under-17 Championship (38th edition if the Under-16 era is also included), the annual international youth football championship organised by UEFA for the men's under-17 national teams of Europe, before being cancelled due to the COVID-19 pandemic. Estonia, which were selected by UEFA on 9 December 2016, were originally to host the tournament. A total of 16 teams were originally to play in the tournament, with players born on or after 1 January 2003 eligible to participate.

The final tournament was originally scheduled to be played between 21 May and 6 June 2020. After initially being postponed due to the COVID-19 pandemic, UEFA announced on 1 April 2020 that the tournament had been cancelled.

The Netherlands were the two-time defending champions.

Qualification

All 55 UEFA nations entered the competition, and with the hosts Estonia qualifying automatically, the other 54 teams competed in the qualifying competition to determine the remaining 15 spots in the final tournament. The qualifying competition consists of two rounds: Qualifying round, which takes place in autumn 2019, and Elite round, which takes place in spring 2020.

Qualified teams
The following teams qualified for the final tournament.

Note: All appearance statistics include only U-17 era (since 2002).

Notes

Final draw
The final draw was originally to be held on 8 April 2020 in Tallinn, Estonia. The 16 teams would be drawn into four groups of four teams. The hosts Estonia would be assigned to position A1 in the draw, while the other teams would be seeded according to their results in the qualification elite round. The seven best elite round group winners (counting all elite round results) would be placed in Pot 1 and drawn to positions 1 and 2 in the groups, and the remaining eight teams (the eighth-best elite round group winner and the seven elite round group runners-up) would be placed in Pot 2 and drawn to positions 3 and 4 in the groups.

Venues
The tournament were originally to be held in eight venues.

A. Le Coq Arena, Tallinn (3 matches in Groups A/B, quarter-final, semi-final, final)
Kadriorg Stadium, Tallinn (4 matches in Groups A/B, semi-final)
Haapsalu Stadium, Haapsalu (2 matches in Groups A/B)
Rakvere Stadium, Rakvere (3 matches in Groups A/B, quarter-final)
Tamme Stadium, Tartu (3 matches in Groups C/D, quarter-final)
Viljandi Stadium, Viljandi (3 matches in Groups C/D)
Tehvandi Stadium, Otepää (3 matches in Groups C/D, quarter-final)
Võru Stadium, Võru (3 matches in Groups C/D)

Squads
Each national team have to submit a squad of 20 players (Regulations Article 38).

Group stage
The group winners and runners-up advance to the quarter-finals.

Tiebreakers
In the group stage, teams are ranked according to points (3 points for a win, 1 point for a draw, 0 points for a loss), and if tied on points, the following tiebreaking criteria are applied, in the order given, to determine the rankings (Regulations Articles 17.01 and 17.02):
Points in head-to-head matches among tied teams;
Goal difference in head-to-head matches among tied teams;
Goals scored in head-to-head matches among tied teams;
If more than two teams are tied, and after applying all head-to-head criteria above, a subset of teams are still tied, all head-to-head criteria above are reapplied exclusively to this subset of teams;
Goal difference in all group matches;
Goals scored in all group matches;
Penalty shoot-out if only two teams have the same number of points, and they met in the last round of the group and are tied after applying all criteria above (not used if more than two teams have the same number of points, or if their rankings are not relevant for qualification for the next stage);
Disciplinary points (red card = 3 points, yellow card = 1 point, expulsion for two yellow cards in one match = 3 points);
UEFA coefficient ranking for the qualifying round draw;
Drawing of lots.

All times are local, EEST (UTC+3).

Group A

Group B

Group C

Group D

Knockout stage
In the knockout stage, penalty shoot-out is used to decide the winner if necessary (no extra time is played).

Bracket

Quarter-finals

Semi-finals

Final

References

External links

Under-17 Matches: 2020, UEFA.com

 
2020
Under-17 Championship
2020 Uefa European Under-17 Championship
2020 in Estonian football
2020 in youth association football
Association football events cancelled due to the COVID-19 pandemic